Dmitri Shostakovich's String Quartet No. 5 in B-flat major, Op. 92, was composed in autumn 1952. It was premiered in Leningrad in November 1953 by the Beethoven Quartet, to whom it is dedicated.

Structure

It consists of three movements, performed without a break:

Playing time is approximately 30 minutes.

The work grows from a five-note motif, C–D–E–B–C, which contains the four pitch-classes of the composer's musical monogram: DSCH (E being Es and B being H in German). This motif appears in a number of his other string quartets, including String Quartet No. 8, as well as his Symphony No. 10.

Notes

References

External links
 

05
1952 compositions
Compositions in B-flat major